An aquarium is a clear-sided container in which water-dwelling plants and animals are kept. 

Aquarium may also refer to:

Buildings
 Public aquarium, a facility that houses living aquatic animal and plant specimens for public viewing

Arts and entertainment

Music 
Aquarium (band), a Russian rock group
The Aquarium (band), an American indie rock band
The Aquarium (album), 2006
Aquarium (Aqua album), 1997 
Aquarium, a 2014 album by Buckethead
"Aquarium", the seventh movement of The Carnival of the Animals by Camille Saint-Saëns

Gaming 
Theme Aquarium, a 1998 video game also known as Aquarium
Aquarium (video game), a 1996 Tetris variant

Other uses in arts and entertainment
Aquarium (manga), a 1990 one-shot shōjo manga by Tomoko Taniguchi
Aquarium (Suvorov), a 1985 book by Viktor Surovov, and film and TV series
Aquarium (TV series), a Canadian documentary series
The Aquarium (film), a 2008 Egyptian drama film
Aquarium (Malayalam film), a 2022 Malayalam film directed by T Deepesh.

Transportation
Aquarium station (MBTA), Boston, Massachusetts, U.S.
Aquarium station (River Line), Camden, New Jersey, U.S.
Aquarium ferry wharf, Sydney, Australia

See also

 Aquaria (disambiguation)
 Aquarius (disambiguation)